Nancy may refer to:

Places

France 
 Nancy, France, a city in the northeastern French department of Meurthe-et-Moselle and formerly the capital of the duchy of Lorraine 
 Arrondissement of Nancy, surrounding and including the city of Nancy 
 Roman Catholic Diocese of Nancy, surrounding and including the city of Nancy
 École de Nancy, the spearhead of the Art Nouveau in France
 Musée de l'École de Nancy, a museum
 Nancy-sur-Cluses, Haute-Savoie

United States 
 Nancy, Kentucky
 Nancy, Virginia
 Mount Nancy, in the White Mountains of New Hampshire

People 
 Nancy (given name), including a list of people and fictional characters with the name
 Nancy (singer) (Nancy Jewel McDonie; born 2000), member of Momoland
 Jean-Luc Nancy (1940–2021), French philosopher
 Nazmun Munira Nancy, Bangladeshi singer

Entertainment 
 Nancy (Nancy Sinatra album), 1969
 Nancy (Nancy Wilson album), 1969
 "Nancy (with the Laughing Face)", a song written by Jimmy Van Heusen and Phil Silvers
 "Nancy", a song by Stan Rogers from the 1984 album From Fresh Water
 Nancy (comic strip), an American comic strip whose title character debuted in 1933
 Nancy (1922), a film based on Oliver Twist with Ivan Berlyn and Sybil Thorndike
 Nancy (film), a 2018 American film
 Nancy (TV series), an American television comedy about the daughter of a United States President
 Nancy (podcast), a 2017 LGBTQ+ podcast
 Nancy (Oliver Twist), a character in the 1838 novel Oliver Twist by Charles Dickens
 Nancy, an alien character in The Transformers

Vessels 
 Nancy (1774 EIC ship), a British East India Company ship
 Nancy (1775), an American brig destroyed in the Battle of Turtle Gut Inlet
 Nancy (1788 ship), a British merchant ship captured by the French in 1794
 Nancy (1789 ship), a schooner destroyed in the Anglo-American War of 1812
 Nancy (1803 ship), a sloop wrecked near Jervis Bay in 1805
 Nancy (1792 ship), a British East India Company ship captured and destroyed by the French in 1805
 , three ships of the British Royal Navy

Other uses 
 Nancy (locomotive), a preserved 1908 British 0-6-0T locomotive
 Nancy, a pejorative term for a effeminate or homosexual man
 Nancy, a lightweight web framework inspired by Sinatra
 Tropical Storm Nancy (disambiguation)
 Upshot-Knothole Nancy, code name of a 1953 experimental nuclear explosion in the Operation Upshot–Knothole series

See also 

 AS Nancy, French association football club 
 SLUC Nancy Basket, a French basketball club
 
 Nanci
 Nance (disambiguation)
 Nancey (disambiguation)
 Mancy (disambiguation)